Alan Peter Steedman (born 7 December 1941) is a former Australian politician. He represented the Australian Labor Party (ALP) in the House of Representatives from 1983 to 1984, holding the Victorian seat of Casey.

Early life
At Melbourne University Steedman edited Farrago, the Melbourne University Student Union paper. He also edited Lot's Wife at Monash University. After leaving university he joined The Age as "editor of a section aimed at the youth market".

Politics
In September 1982, Steedman won ALP preselection for the Division of Casey. He was elected to the House of Representatives at the 1983 federal election, defeating the incumbent Liberal MP Peter Falconer. However, a redistribution made his seat marginally Liberal, and as a result he was defeated at the 1984 election by Liberal Bob Halverson.

Steedman used parliamentary privilege on several occasions to allege that members of the Liberal and National parties were neo-Nazis, notably accusing Senator Florence Bjelke-Petersen of associating with a man he described as "one of Australia's most notorious Nazis and Hitler lovers".

Steedman was an unsuccessful candidate for ALP preselection at the 1986 Scullin by-election. His candidacy brought him into conflict with former state secretary Bill Hartley, who made public comments disparaging him. He was later defeated by Jenny Macklin for preselection in Jagajaga prior to the 1996 federal election. Steedman remained involved in the ALP as a delegate to state and national conferences. In 1990 he argued against the Hawke Government's proposed privatisation of Qantas and Trans Australia Airlines, stating that Treasurer Paul Keating had "systematically and knowingly stuffed the airlines up and starved them of funds" as part of a strategy to "sabotage them".

Other activities
Steedman was the executive director of Ausmusic from 1988 to 1996. The organisation was established with financial assistance from the federal government to support the Australian music industry. It was sold in March 1998 to Entertainment World Limited (EWL).

Steedman later coordinated a campaign to revive the Healesville railway line as a tourist line servicing the Yarra Valley.

Personal life
Steedman previously owned a  property in Hurstbridge, Victoria, with his wife Julie Reiter, a potter. He bought the property in the 1970s from playwright David Williamson, a university friend.

References

1941 births
Living people
Australian Labor Party members of the Parliament of Australia
Members of the Australian House of Representatives for Casey
Members of the Australian House of Representatives
20th-century Australian politicians